Philetus Swift House is a historic home located at Phelps in Ontario County, New York. The limestone dwelling was built in two stages between 1792 and 1816.  It is distinguished by a 2½-story, three-bay side-hall Federal-style main block (1816) and 2-story side ell (1792).  Also on the property are two contributing barns.

It was listed on the National Register of Historic Places in 2005.

References

Houses on the National Register of Historic Places in New York (state)
Federal architecture in New York (state)
Houses completed in 1792
Houses in Ontario County, New York
National Register of Historic Places in Ontario County, New York